Arizona Western College (AWC) is a public community college in Yuma, Arizona. It offers associate degrees, occupational certificates, and transfer degrees.

AWC also offers classes in Dateland, La Paz, San Luis, Somerton, and Wellton.

Academics 

Arizona Western College offers over 100 degrees and certificates in person and online. Its associate degrees include: Arts (AA), Science (AS), Business (ABus) and Applied Science (AAS). Students graduating from Arizona Western College can easily transfer to one of Arizona's three in-state universities governed by the Arizona Board of Regents, including Arizona State University (ASU) in Tempe, Northern Arizona University (NAU) in Flagstaff, or the University of Arizona (UA) in Tucson.

On-campus housing 
Arizona Western College is one of the few community colleges in the United States to offer on-campus housing. The main campus has three residence halls that house up to 348 residents.

Student life 
AWC has more than 50 clubs and organizations for those interested in math, music, athletics, cooking and chess.

Athletics 
AWC's athletic teams compete in the National Junior College Athletic Association (NJCAA) and the Arizona Community College Athletic Conference (ACCAC) and are collectively known as the Matadors. They competed in the Western States Football League (WSFL) until 2018, when changes in football programs in nearby colleges prohibited them from participating in this League.

The Arizona Western College Matadors field eight intercollegiate teams, four for men and four for women. Men's sports at Arizona Western include baseball, basketball, football, and soccer. The Matador women compete in basketball, soccer, softball, and volleyball. The basketball, baseball, and football teams have produced numerous professional athletes like Leonard Thompson, Crawford Ker, Rafael Araujo, Bengie Molina, Sergio Romo, Randy Gregory, and Nate Archibald. In 2014, the Matadors football team won the El Toro Bowl to finish the season with an 11 - 1 record.

References

External links 
 Official website

 
Community colleges in Arizona
Buildings and structures in Yuma, Arizona
Education in Yuma County, Arizona
Educational institutions established in 1963
1963 establishments in Arizona